The Scottish Rugby Schools' Cup is the annual Scottish schools' rugby union cup competition.  Competitions are held at under 18 and under 16 age group levels and are organised by Scottish Rugby.  The finals are held at Murrayfield Stadium in Edinburgh.

The competitions have had many different formats over the years.  For season 2022-23 there are four competitions for each age group, the Cup, Shield, Plate and Bowl.  The main cup competitions involve a straight knock-out format.  In 2013-14 a new shield competition was introduced for those teams eliminated in the preliminary and first rounds of the cup competitions.

The fixtures and results are regularly posted on the Scottish Rugby website and in the mainstream media.  Previous sponsors include the Bank of Scotland, Bell Lawrie White and Brewin Dolphin.

U18 Cup
Key:

The inaugural competition took place from the start of the 1983–84 season.

Prior to the 1997–98 season most Private schools did not participate in the U18 Cup.

Winners of the U18 Cup competition include:

U16 Cup
The inaugural competition took place from the start of the 2004–05 season.

From season 2010-11 the competition evolved from the U15 Cup into the U16 Cup.

Winners of the U15 Cup competition include:

Winners of the U16 Cup competition include:

Scotland internationalists
A number of full Scotland internationalists have played in the schools' cup.  Some of whom are listed below:

John Barclay
Alasdair Dickinson
Phil Godman
Ruaridh Jackson
Graeme Morrison 
Gregor Townsend
Richie Vernon

References

External links
 Schools Rugby website
 Scottish Rugby website

Recurring sporting events established in 1983
School sport in the United Kingdom
Schools' Cup
High school rugby union